KDKD may refer to:

 KDKD-FM, a radio station (95.3 FM) licensed to Clinton, Missouri, United States
 KDKD (AM), a defunct radio station (1280 AM) formerly licensed to Clinton, Missouri